The Polish Center for Holocaust Research is an academic and research center at the Polish Academy of Sciences in Warsaw, Poland. The center's director is historian Barbara Engelking.

History
The Polish Center for Holocaust Research, created in 2003, is an interdisciplinary research facility devoted to studying the Holocaust in historical perspective. The Center brings together psychologists, sociologists, literary historians, cultural anthropologists, and other scholars in order to provide knowledge on the nature, scope, and effects of the Holocaust. In 2007, to support and expand the center's activities, the Association of the Polish Center for Holocaust Research was created.

The Center coordinates research and educational projects, grants, seminars, conferences, and workshops, and publishes books and papers by Polish scholars as well as translations of works in other languages.  Since 2005, the center has published an academic journal, Holocaust Studies and Materials.

In February 2018, Jakub Petelewicz, speaking as academic secretary of the Polish Center for Holocaust Research, expressed concern that a 2018 Polish law criminalizing discussion of negative Polish actions in the Holocaust may hinder the work of Poland-based academics and institutions. While the law contains an exemption for academic and artistic work, he said the lack of definitions could lead to confusion. For instance, he expressed concern that presenting materials to schools and discussing findings publicly might be prevented. Another concern he raised was the possibility of being sued personally or as an institution by right-wing groups under provisions of the law allowing for lawsuits to defend "the good name of the Polish nation." Petelwicz described the overall effect of the law as pressuring academics to play down negative actions by Poles and emphasize suffering by Poles.

Reception
Kornelia Kończal writes that "[the Center] has produced an impressive body of innovative studies dealing with the history of the Second World War in Poland. Most of the studies have been highly appreciated by the international academic community and largely ignored by the Polish readership." Michael Whine stated that "its scholars have completely rewritten the historiography of the destruction of Polish Jewry" and that the center had been attacked by "Poland’s nationalist government, which does not look kindly on the scholars who have exposed many examples of local cooperation with the Germans in the destruction and despoliation of Polish Jews". German historian Dieter Pohl described the center as eminent and praised its "most innovative historiography".

Marta Kurkowska-Budzan and Marcin Stasiak state that the center's work has "contributed vastly to World War II historiography" but has had less of an impact on the methodology of contemporary Polish history in general. Historian Havi Dreifuss states that the center's researchers "demonstrate that treachery and harm to Jews—due to a variety of motives—existed throughout occupied Poland, for long years and on a large geographical scale. A whole new set of questions are opened by the perception that among the Jews who tried to flee, most of the victims fell due to considerable Polish involvement—whether by apprehension and extradition to the Germans, or by outright murder—and not merely because of German traps."

David Engel criticizes what he called the self-assumed "national mission" to help the Polish people confront some of their alleged atrocious deeds and become "more mature", in lieu of their "whining self-image of victims". Engel writes that that is not the role of historians, who rather should pursue objective, scholarly research in the interest of broad academic and international discourse.

Dalej jest noc
In 2018 the Center released a Polish-language study on The Fate of Jews in Selected Counties of Occupied Poland (Polish title: Dalej jest noc, Night Goes On), co-edited by Jan Grabowski and Barbara Engelking, and co-authored with seven other Center members. The 1,600-page, two-volume study covers nine counties in German established General Government out of 63. The study identified small Polish towns as particularly dangerous, or "death traps", for Jews in hiding. Historian Jacek Chrobaczyński notes that all nine studies in the study were prepared with the same methodology and style and highlights the study's importance in deconstructing political myths and propaganda partially present in Polish history, journalism, church, and politics.

The director Barbara Engelking protested against a memorial of the righteous near the POLIN Museum of the History of Polish Jews in Warsaw.

2019 Paris Conference
In February 2019, the Center co-organized the New Polish School of Holocaust Scholarship in Paris. The conference was disrupted by Polish nationalists. The Polish Institute of National Remembrance (IPN), which had made social media postings during the conference and sent a delegate, was criticized by French higher education minister Frédérique Vidal, who said the disturbances were "highly regrettable" and "anti-Semitic". Vidal further stated the disturbances organized by Gazeta Polska activists, appeared to have been condoned by the IPN whose representative did not condemn the disruption and which criticized the conference on social media that were further re-tweeted by the Embassy of Poland, Paris. Polish Minister of General and Higher Education Jarosław Gowin issued a statement saying that he could not identify in the transcripts provided any antisemitic attacks.

The Fondation pour la Mémoire de la Shoah, Human rights ambassador François Croquette, and the International Holocaust Remembrance Alliance released statements against the disruption.

Publications
 W. Burszta, B. Engelking, J. Grabowski, D. Libionka, D. Swałtek, A. Skibińska, Z. Schnepf-Kołacz, J. Leociak; red. B. Engelking, D. Grabowski; wstęp: K. Persak  ZARYS KRAJOBRAZU. Wieś polska wobec zagłady Żydów 1942-1945, Stowarzyszenie Centrum Badań nad Zagładą Żydów, Warszawa 2011.
 Jan Grabowski  JUDENJAGD. Polowanie na Żydów 1942-1945. Studium dziejów pewnego powiatu, Stowarzyszenie Centrum Badań nad Zagładą Żydów, Warszawa 2011.
 Barbara Engelking  JEST TAKI PIĘKNY SŁONECZNY DZIEŃ ... Losy Żydów szukających ratunku na wsi polskiej 1942-1945, Stowarzyszenie Centrum Badań nad Zagładą Żydów, Warszawa 2011.
 Barbara Engelking, Jan Grabowski  Żydów łamiących prawo należy karać śmiercią. >>Przestępczość<< Żydów w Warszawie, 1939-1942, Stowarzyszenie Centrum Badań nad Zagładą Żydów, Warszawa 2010.
 Barbara Engelking, Jacek Leociak, Dariusz Libionka, Wiesława Młynarczyk, Jakub Petelewicz, Alina Skibińska, Robert Szuchta, pod red. Aliny Skibińskiej i Roberta Szuchty  Wybór źródeł do nauczania o zagładzie Żydów na okupowanych ziemiach polskich oraz Ćwiczenia ze źródłami, Stowarzyszenie Centrum Badań nad Zagładą Żydów, Warszawa 2010.
 Cecylia Gruft  W Imię Boże!, Stowarzyszenie Centrum Badań nad Zagładą Żydów, Warszawa 2009.
 Barbara Engelking, Dariusz Libionka  Żydzi w powstańczej Warszawie, Stowarzyszenie Centrum Badań nad Zagładą Żydów, Warszawa 2009.
 Barbara Engelking-Boni,  Szanowny Panie Gistapo. Donosy do władz niemieckich w  Warszawie i okolicach w latach 1940- 1941, Wydawnictwo IFiS PAN, Warszawa 2003.
 Jan Grabowski,  "Ja tego Żyda znam!" Szantażowanie Żydów w Warszawie 1939-1943, Wydawnictwo IFiS PAN, Warszawa 2003
 Agnieszka Haska,  "Jestem Żydem, chcę wejść!" Hotel Polski w Warszawie, 1943, Wydawnictwo IFiS PAN, Warszawa 2006.
 Raul Hilberg,  Sprawcy, Ofiary, Świadkowie. Zagłada Żydów, 1933-1945, tłum. J.Giebułtowski, Centrum Badań nad Zagładą Żydów IFiS PAN i Wydawnictwo Cyklady, Warszawa 2007.
 Centrum Badań nad Zagładą Żydów - Publikacje - Prowincja noc Prowincja Noc. Życie i zagłada Żydów w dystrykcie warszawskim], Centrum Badań nad Zagładą Żydów IFiS PAN, Warszawa 2007.
 Gunnar S. Paulsson, Centrum Badań nad Zagładą Żydów - Publikacje - Utajone miasto Utajone miasto. Żydzi po "aryjskiej" stronie Warszawy 1940-1945], tłum. Elżbieta Olender-Dmowska, Centrum Badań nad Zagładą Żydów IFiS PAN i Wydawnictwo Znak, Kraków 2008.
 Alina Skibińska,  Źródła do badań nad zagładą Żydów na okupowanych ziemiach polskich. Przewodnik archiwalno-bibliograficzny, Centrum Badań nad Zagładą Żydów IFiS PAN i Wydawnictwo Cyklady, Warszawa 2007
 Szmul Rozensztajn,  Notatnik, tłum. i oprac. Monika Polit, Stowarzyszenie Centrum Badań nad Zagładą Żydów, Warszawa 2008
 Perec Opoczyński,  Reportaże z warszawskiego getta, tłum. i oprac. Monika Polit, Stowarzyszenie Centrum Badań nad Zagładą Żydów, Warszawa 2009
 Zagłada Żydów. Studia i Materiały in Polish (see, below); vol.1-14; R. 2005–2017; Warszawa 2005-2017
 Holocaust Studies and Materials; vol.1; R. 2008; Warszawa 2008
 Holocaust Studies and Materials; vol.2; R. 2010; Warszawa 2010
 Holocaust Studies and Materials; vol.3; R. 2013; Warszawa 2013

References

External links 
 Polish Center for Holocaust Research website 
 Holocaust Studies and Materials website

Holocaust-related organizations
Holocaust studies
Polish Academy of Sciences
2003 establishments in Poland
Organizations established in 2003